The Cathedral Basilica of the Immaculate Conception, located in Derek Walcott Square, Castries, Saint Lucia, is the seat of the Archbishop of the Roman Catholic Archdiocese of Castries, currently Robert Rivas. The cathedral is named after Mary, mother of Jesus, under her title, Our Lady of the Immaculate Conception.

The interior is decorated by a mural by St. Lucian artist Dunstan St. Omer.

References

Roman Catholic cathedrals in Saint Lucia
Basilica churches in the Caribbean
Buildings and structures in Castries
1899 establishments in the British Empire
1890s establishments in the Caribbean
1899 establishments in North America
Churches completed in 1899